Mong (also called Mang) is a city and village in Sudhnoti District of Azad Kashmir, Pakistan. Sudhan (Sadozai) is the main tribes of Mong.

Geography

Mong consists of 7 villages and 3 union councils: Mong, Patan Shar Khan, and Dhingroon Kanchri. The major villages in Mong are Mehna Naar'orri,  Dhara & Daar, Thaneliyaan Khoor, Kanchri, Dhingroon and Pattan Shar Khan.

Mong is well connected by roads to major cities of Kashmir and Pakistan. Mong is connected to Pallandri, Rawalakot, Thorar. Daily buses carry passengers inter-state as well as within the city. The nearest major airport is located at Rawalakot.
Yadgar-E-Shohda,
Jassa Peer are best places to visit in Mong

Education
Mong has several schools and a campus of the University of Poonch.
Girls And Boys Degree Colleges,
Madarsa Dar-Al-Ullom,
Fauji Foundation School

Notable people 
 Khan of Mong Captain Khan Muhammad Khan, guerrilla leader in the First Kashmir War  
Col Sher Khan Shaheed
Molana Mohammad Yousaf
Sain Sani Sarkar
Sardar Liaqat Shaheen(Justice high court)
Sardar Najeeb Adv
Sardar Shahid Hanif Adv
Sardar Attique Sakhawat(DG)
Sardar Wahab(Tax Consultant)

References 

Populated places in Sudhanoti District
Tehsils of Sudhanoti District